Hurab (also Romanized as Ḩūrāb) is a village in Howmeh Rural District, in the Central District of Kahnuj County, Kerman Province, Iran. At the 2006 census, its population was 97, in 23 families.

References 

Populated places in Kahnuj County